The Berea is a ridge above the city of Durban, KwaZulu-Natal, South Africa on the northern side which overlooks the city centre and the Indian Ocean. Berea is also used as a collective designation for the suburbs in the area. It has been described as the area between the Howard College Campus of the University of KwaZulu-Natal, and the Burman Bush Nature Reserve.

Some of the oldest mansions in Durban were built in this once forested area. Today, many of these have been converted into offices or made way for apartment buildings. The Berea was once the most expensive real estate area in the province but is now third to Umhlanga and Durban North.

The two main areas of the Berea are Musgrave and upper Glenwood which are separated by the N3 Western Freeway highway which leads into the city centre.

Places of interest include shopping malls including The Atrium (formerly Overport City), Berea Centre, Musgrave Centre, schools including Clifton School, Durban Girls' College, Durban High School and Maris Stella, Mitchell Park, the botanical gardens and the Howard College campus of the University of KwaZulu-Natal.

A related neighbouring area designation is Overport.

Durbanites who have called Berea their home include cricketer Andrew Hudson, radio personality Alan Khan, and TV presenter Imraan Vagar.

The Berea borders the orange-roofed Durban suburb of Morningside.

In popular culture
Berea in the 1950s is described by the writer Alan Paton in the novel Ah, but Your Land Is Beautiful as being notable for its "stately indigenous trees".

References

Suburbs of Durban